is a railway station in the town of Kunimi, Fukushima, Japan operated by East Japan Railway Company (JR East).

Lines
Kaida Station is served by the Tōhoku Main Line, and is located 294.9 rail kilometers from the official starting point of the line at Tokyo Station.

Station layout
The station has two opposed side platforms connected to the station building by a footbridge. The station is unattended.

Platforms

History
Kaida Station opened on June 10, 1952, although a signal stop had existed at this location since June 5, 1922. The station was absorbed into the JR East network upon the privatization of the Japanese National Railways (JNR) on April 1, 1987.

Surrounding area

See also
 List of Railway Stations in Japan

External links

  

Stations of East Japan Railway Company
Railway stations in Fukushima Prefecture
Tōhoku Main Line
Railway stations in Japan opened in 1952
Kunimi, Fukushima